The South Philadelphia Shtiebel is an active synagogue and center of Jewish life in the East Passyunk neighborhood of South Philadelphia. The South Philadelphia Shtiebel is led by Rabbanit Hadas Fruchter, and offers educational, community, and religious programming.

Congregation History

South Philadelphia's Jewish community flourished between the 1880s and World War II. Between Third and Eighth Streets, and from Spruce Street south to Oregon Avenue, the Jewish community numbered 150,000 at its height in the 1940s. South Philadelphia was home to more than 150 “rowhouse Shuls” — small synagogues located in rowhouses where often the rabbi lived upstairs, and prayer took place downstairs. The Shtiebel picked its organization's name in homage to this history.

The number of South Philadelphia shuls decreased in the late 1960s and early 1970s with changes in neighborhood demography. In 2019 there were approximately ten active synagogues in Society Hill and South Philadelphia, with only two south of South Street. In recent years, South Philadelphia neighborhoods have attracted new residents including a growing number of Orthodox Jews.

 Hadas Fruchter was ordained by the Open Orthodoxy Maharat in June 2016 upon completion of the Maharat Semikha Program. She served three years as assistant spiritual leader at Beth Sholom Congregation and Talmud Torah in Potomac, Maryland. With initial funding and support from Hillel International's Office of Innovation, private donors, and Start-Up Shul, an organization that builds institutions, Fruchter announced her plans in July 2018 to move to Philadelphia and open her own synagogue that "will look like a typical modern Orthodox congregation".

Seeing the growing Jewish community in South Philadelphia and interest in additional local Jewish programming, Fruchter founded the South Philadelphia Shtiebel in 2019. The Shtiebel moved into a space at 1733 E Passyunk Avenue in March 2019, previously Philadelphia Scooters.

The synagogue held its first prayer services on Friday night, July 19, 2019 with 80 in attendance.

The Shtiebel was unable to hold indoor gatherings in its storefront following Purim in March 2020 and through the COVID-19 pandemic in Philadelphia. Programming was offered online and limited services held in open outdoor spaces.  In closing its location at 1733 E Passyunk Ave, the Shtiebel announced its plans to move into a larger physical location when indoor activities proved safe to resume.

The Shtiebel relocated in 2021 to a building on S Juniper St in the same neighborhood and continued its community activities including hosting an annual public Hanukkah lighting.

References

External links 
SouthPhiladelphiaShtiebel.com
Facebook/southphiladelphiashtiebel

Ashkenazi Jewish culture in Philadelphia
Ashkenazi synagogues
South Philadelphia
Synagogues in Philadelphia
Unaffiliated synagogues in Pennsylvania